Henry Sutton was an Anglican priest in the first half of the seventeenth century.

He was Chaplain to Oliver St John, 1st Viscount Grandison, Lord Deputy of Ireland and Rector of Ardrahan.  He was appointed Dean of Waterford on 17 November 1620; Dean of Derry on 3 May 1621  and  Dean of Limerick on 9 November 1635, serving until 1640.

References

17th-century Irish Anglican priests
Deans of Limerick
Deans of Derry
Deans of Waterford